Bucculatrix nigripunctella is a moth in the family Bucculatricidae. It is found in North America, where it has been recorded from California. It was described by Annette Frances Braun in 1923.

References

Natural History Museum Lepidoptera generic names catalog

Bucculatricidae
Moths described in 1923
Moths of North America
Taxa named by Annette Frances Braun